Eduard Rothauser (1876–1956) was an Austrian-born German actor.

Selected filmography
 The Man in the Cellar (1914)
 The Princess of Urbino (1919)
 Nobody Knows (1920)
 The Graveyard of the Living (1921)
 The Maharaja's Favourite Wife (1921)
 The Romance of a Poor Sinner (1922)
 Esterella (1923)
 And Yet Luck Came (1923)
 The Chain Clinks (1923)
 Garragan (1924)
In den Krallen der Schuld (1924)
 Slums of Berlin (1925)
 The Hanseatics (1925)
 Living Buddhas (1925)
 People to Each Other (1926)
Manon Lescaut (1926)
 Children of No Importance (1926)
Mata Hari (1927)
Schwester Veronica (1927)
 Assassination (1927)
The Holy Lie (1927)
 Queen Louise (1928)
Bobby, the Petrol Boy (1929)
Dreyfus (1930)
 The Trunks of Mr. O.F. (1931)
 A Tremendously Rich Man (1932)
Marschall Vorwärts (1932)
Herthas Erwachen (1933)
 What Men Know (1933)

Bibliography

External links

Austrian male film actors
German male film actors
German male silent film actors
Male actors from Budapest
1876 births
1956 deaths
20th-century German male actors
20th-century Austrian male actors
Austro-Hungarian emigrants to Germany